Oor is the oldest currently published music magazine in the Netherlands.  is the Dutch word for ear.

History
The magazine was first published on 1 April 1971, being founded by Barend Toet. Of the first issue 20,000 copies were printed and paid for by Berry Visser, one of the co-founders of Mojo Concerts. The magazine was sold to Levisson on 1 January 1972. In 1978 the magazine was bought by Elsevier. Halfway through the 1990s, Oor was sold to the Telegraaf Media Group. In 2002, Oor was bought by Erik de Vlieger's Imca Media Group. Since 2006, Argo Media is the owner.  

Originally, Oor was published as a newspaper, hence the word 'krant' in the name. From the 1980s onward, the word Muziekkrant was dropped from the title and Oor had become a magazine. In 2005 the publication frequency changed from bi-weekly to monthly.

References

External links
www.oor.nl

1971 establishments in the Netherlands
Biweekly magazines
Dutch-language magazines
Monthly magazines published in the Netherlands
Music magazines published in the Netherlands
Magazines established in 1971